"I Can't Get Enough" is a song by Swedish singer Cazzi Opeia, released as a single on 19 February 2022. It was performed in Melodifestivalen 2022 and qualified to the final on 12 March 2022.

Melodifestivalen 2022
"I Can't Get Enough" was performed in Heat 3 on 19 February 2022. She garnered 63 points and qualified to the semi-final. She later qualified to the final on 12 March 2022, where she placed 9th with 55 points.

Charts

Weekly charts

Year-end charts

References

2022 songs
2022 singles
Melodifestivalen songs of 2022